Lee Jae-gun (born 22 February 1997) is a South Korean footballer who plays as a forward for Cambodian Premier League club Visakha.

Playing career
After graduating from Kyunghee High School in Seoul, Lee received several offers from professional clubs. He turned them down, however, to play for Songho College. In his second season at the college, he scored five of his team's ten goals, and took his school to the 2016 U-League championship game, where they lost to Korea University.

He was selected to represent Korea at the 2016 Asian University Football Championships in Taebaek.

In January 2017, he signed his first professional contract with A.F.C. Tubize, playing in the second-tier of Belgian football. He became Tubize's sixth Korean player. The team, which was purchased by a Korean company in 2014, promotes the development of Korean football by recruiting young prospects from the Asian country. He made his debut on 7 January against Cercle Brugge, replacing Shean Garlito in the 89th minute. Two months later, during a 1-1 draw against Oud-Heverlee Leuven, Lee scored his debut goal.

References

External links

 
 

Living people
1997 births
South Korean footballers
South Korean expatriate footballers
Association football forwards
A.F.C. Tubize players
Asan Mugunghwa FC players
Chungnam Asan FC players
Visakha FC players
Challenger Pro League players
K League 2 players
Cambodian Premier League players
South Korean expatriate sportspeople in Belgium
South Korean expatriate sportspeople in Cambodia
Expatriate footballers in Belgium
Expatriate footballers in Cambodia